ESUS may refer to:

 Esus, a Gaulish god
 Embolic stroke of undetermined source
 English-Speaking Union Scotland, a Scottish educational charity
 Elite Specialist Undercover Squad, a fictional organization in the TV series Supply & Demand

See also 
 Esu (disambiguation)